Asa Robinson  (1883 – 8 December 1924) was an English professional rugby league footballer who played in the 1900s, 1910s and 1920s. He played at representative level for Great Britain, England and Yorkshire, and at club level for Halifax (Heritage № 138), as a forward (prior to the specialist positions of), during the era of contested scrums.

Biography
Robinson was born in Northowram, Yorkshire. Standing 6'2", his expansive reach earned him the nickname "The Octopus." During the First World War, he served as a gunner with the Royal Garrison Artillery in France and was awarded the Military Medal.

He remained in Yorkshire and was a frequent site at Thrum Hall, where he was one of the most popular players of his era. He died at age 40 some time after undergoing an operation for an internal health complaint.

Playing career

International honours
Asa Robinson won caps for England while at Halifax in 1908 against Wales (2 matches), and New Zealand, in 1909 against Australia (3 matches), and won caps for Great Britain while at Halifax in 1908 against New Zealand, and in 1908-09 against Australia (2 matches).

County Honours
Asa Robinson won caps for Yorkshire while at Halifax.

Testimonial match
A testimonial match at Halifax was shared by Joe Riley, and Asa Robinson at Thrum Hall, Halifax in 1920, 20,000 people attended the match.

Honoured at Halifax
Asa Robinson is a Halifax Hall Of Fame Inductee.

References

1883 births
1924 deaths
British Army personnel of World War I
Date of birth missing
England national rugby league team players
English rugby league players
Great Britain national rugby league team players
Halifax R.L.F.C. players
Recipients of the Military Medal
Royal Garrison Artillery soldiers
Rugby league forwards
Rugby league players from Halifax, West Yorkshire
Yorkshire rugby league team players
Military personnel from Yorkshire